Marko Ljubinković (born 7 December 1981) is a Serbian former footballer.

Career
He started his career at Red Star Belgrade youth, but he did not play for the team. In 2000, Radnički Kragujevac bought him, and he stayed there for almost three years. He spent six years in the Serbian Second Division.

In 2006, he was bought by FC Vaslui, for a mere $50,000. At first, he played as a defensive midfielder, and he scored only 2 goals in the 2006–07 season. However, Mircea Rednic wanted him on his team, offering 1.5 million dollars for Ljubinković and Ștefan Mardare, but Adrian Porumboiu declined the offer. In the next season, Dorinel Munteanu took Ljubinković's role in the field, letting him a free role. He scored in the opening match, a 2–2 draw against UTA Arad. He was also, the first player who scored in the new championship. In the second game of the season, he failed to score, but he was one of the most dangerous Vaslui player in the 2–0 win against the current champions Dinamo București. From the 3rd until the 11th game, he scored each game, being able to be in the front of the goalscorers. In the first game of the 2008, he scored again against Dacia Mioveni, in a 3–0 win. He scored the 100th goal for Vaslui in Liga I, in a 3–0 victory against Poli Timișoara. He finished on the 3rd position of the top-scorers, with 16 goals. In the new season, he scored at the first game, against Steaua București, in a 1–0 win. On 21 March 2009, he scored a goal from almost 35 m against Farul. He has scored, at the moment, only 6 goals, in the new season. In the 2009–10, after a conflict with Marius Lăcătuș, he was sent to the second team, but he did not play. In the summer, 2010 he managed to release his contract with Vaslui. After brief spells with Serbian side Sloboda Point Sevojno and Cypriots Αnorthosis, at the end of August 2011 he signed a two-year deal with another Serbian SuperLiga side FK Vojvodina.

Statistics

Honours

Vaslui
UEFA Intertoto Cup
Winner: 2008

Individual
 Scored the 100th goal for Vaslui in Liga I, 20 March 2008 vs Poli Timișoara
 Vaslui top scorer: 2007–08
 Vaslui player of the season: 2007–08

External sources
 
 Marko Ljubinković at Playerhistory.com

1981 births
Living people
Footballers from Belgrade
Serbian footballers
Serbian expatriate footballers
Association football midfielders
Red Star Belgrade footballers
FK Radnički 1923 players
FK Rad players
FK Sloboda Užice players
FK Vojvodina players
FK Radnički Niš players
Serbian SuperLiga players
FC Vaslui players
Liga I players
Expatriate footballers in Romania
Serbian expatriate sportspeople in Romania
Anorthosis Famagusta F.C. players
Cypriot First Division players
Expatriate footballers in Cyprus
Serbian expatriate sportspeople in Cyprus
Changchun Yatai F.C. players
Chinese Super League players
Expatriate footballers in China
Serbian expatriate sportspeople in China